The Baltimore Ravens are a professional American football team based in Baltimore. The Ravens compete in the National Football League (NFL) as a member club of the American Football Conference (AFC) North division. The team plays its home games at M&T Bank Stadium and is headquartered in Owings Mills, Maryland.

The Baltimore Ravens were established in 1996 after Art Modell, then owner of the Cleveland Browns, announced plans in 1995 to relocate the franchise from Cleveland to Baltimore. As part of a settlement between the league and the city of Cleveland, Modell was required to leave the Browns' history, team colors, and records in Cleveland for a replacement team and replacement personnel that would resume play in 1999. In return, he was allowed to take his own personnel and team to Baltimore, where such personnel would then form an expansion team. The team is now owned by Steve Bisciotti and valued at $2.98 billion, making the Ravens the 33rd-most valuable sports franchise in the world.

The team has qualified for the NFL playoffs 14 times since 2000 with two Super Bowl titles (Super Bowl XXXV and Super Bowl XLVII), two AFC Championship titles (2000 and 2012), four AFC Championship game appearances (2000, 2008, 2011 and 2012) and six AFC North division titles (2003, 2006, 2011, 2012, 2018, and 2019). They are one of two teams to be undefeated in multiple Super Bowl appearances, along with the Tampa Bay Buccaneers. The Ravens organization was led by general manager Ozzie Newsome from 1996 until his retirement following the 2018 season, and has had three head coaches: Ted Marchibroda, Brian Billick, and since 2008, John Harbaugh. Starting with a record-breaking defensive performance in their 2000 season, the Ravens have established a reputation for strong defensive play throughout team history. Former players such as middle linebacker Ray Lewis, safety Ed Reed, and offensive tackle Jonathan Ogden have been enshrined in the Pro Football Hall of Fame.

History

Team name
The name "Ravens" was inspired by Edgar Allan Poe's poem The Raven. Chosen in a fan contest that drew 33,288 voters, the allusion honors Poe who spent the early part of his career in Baltimore and is buried there. As The Baltimore Sun reported at the time, fans also "liked the tie-in with the other birds in town, the Orioles, and found it easy to visualize a tough, menacing black bird". Edgar Allan Poe also had distant relatives who played football for the Princeton Tigers in the 1880s through the early 1900s. These brothers were famous players in the early days of American football.

Before the football team, there was the Baltimore Ravens wheelchair basketball team — the original Baltimore Ravens. In 1972, the Ravens wheelchair basketball team was founded by Ralph Smith, long-term resident of Baltimore, second Vice President of the National Wheelchair Basketball Association (NWBA) and Member of the NWBA Hall of Fame. The name "Ravens" was inspired by Bob Ardinger, a member of the Ravens wheelchair basketball team. In the 1990s, the naming rights were later sold to the football team when they came to the city and the wheelchair basketball team became known as the Maryland Ravens, Inc.

Background
After the controversial relocation of the Colts to Indianapolis, several attempts were made to bring an NFL team back to Baltimore. In 1993, ahead of the 1995 league expansion, the city was considered a favorite, behind only St. Louis, to be granted one of two new franchises. League officials and team owners feared litigation due to conflicts between rival bidding groups if St. Louis was awarded a franchise. In October Charlotte, North Carolina was the first city chosen. Several weeks later, Baltimore's bid for a franchise—dubbed the Baltimore Bombers, in honor of the locally produced Martin B-26 Marauder bomber—had three ownership groups in place and a state financial package which included a proposed $200 million, rent-free stadium and permission to charge up to $80 million in personal seat license fees. Baltimore, however, was unexpectedly passed over in favor of Jacksonville, Florida, despite Jacksonville's minor TV market status and that the city had withdrawn from contention in the summer, only to return with then-Commissioner Paul Tagliabue's urging. Although league officials denied that any city had been favored, it was reported that Tagliabue and his longtime friend Washington Redskins owner Jack Kent Cooke had lobbied against Baltimore due to its proximity to Washington, D.C., and that Tagliabue had used the initial committee voting system to prevent the entire league ownership from voting on Baltimore's bid. This led to public outrage and The Baltimore Sun describing Tagliabue as having an "Anybody But Baltimore" policy. Maryland governor William Donald Schaefer said afterward that Tagliabue had led him on, praising Baltimore and the proposed owners while working behind-the-scenes to oppose Baltimore's bid.

By May 1994, Baltimore Orioles owner Peter Angelos had gathered a new group of investors, including author Tom Clancy, to bid on teams whose owners had expressed interest in relocating. Angelos found a potential partner in Georgia Frontiere, who was open to moving the Los Angeles Rams to Baltimore. Jack Kent Cooke opposed the move, intending to build the Redskins' new stadium in Laurel, Maryland, close enough to Baltimore to cool outside interest in bringing in a new franchise. This led to heated arguments between Cooke and Angelos, who accused Cooke of being a "carpetbagger." The league eventually persuaded Rams team president John Shaw to relocate to St. Louis instead, leading to a league-wide rumor that Tagliabue was again steering interest away from Baltimore, a claim which Tagliabue denied. In response to anger in Baltimore, including Governor Schaefer's threat to announce over the loudspeakers Tagliabue's exact location in Camden Yards any time he attended a Baltimore Orioles game, Tagliabue remarked of Baltimore's financial package: "Maybe (Baltimore) can open another museum with that money." Following this, Angelos made an unsuccessful $200 million bid to bring the Tampa Bay Buccaneers to Baltimore.

Having failed to obtain a franchise via the expansion, the city, despite having "misgivings," turned to the possibility of obtaining the Cleveland Browns, whose owner Art Modell was financially struggling and at odds with the city of Cleveland over needed improvements to the team's stadium.

Return of American football in Baltimore

Enticed by Baltimore's available funds for a first-class stadium and a promised yearly operating subsidy of $25 million, Modell announced on November 6, 1995, his intention to relocate the team from Cleveland to Baltimore the following year. The resulting controversy ended when representatives of Cleveland and the NFL reached a settlement on February 8, 1996. Tagliabue promised the city of Cleveland that an NFL team would be located in Cleveland, either through relocation or expansion, "no later than 1999". Additionally, the agreement stipulated that the Browns' name, colors, uniform design and franchise records would remain in Cleveland. The franchise history includes Browns club records and connections with Pro Football Hall of Fame players. Modell's Baltimore team, while retaining all current player contracts, would, for purposes of team history, appear as an expansion team, a new franchise. Not all players, staff or front office would make the move to Baltimore, however.

After relocation, Modell hired Ted Marchibroda as the head coach for his new team in Baltimore. Marchibroda was already well known because of his work as head coach of the Baltimore Colts during the 1970s and the Indianapolis Colts during the early 1990s. Ozzie Newsome, the Browns' tight end for many seasons, joined Modell in Baltimore as director of football operations. He was later promoted to vice-president/general manager.

The home stadium for the Ravens first two seasons was Baltimore's Memorial Stadium, previously home to the Baltimore Colts, the Baltimore Orioles, and the Canadian Football League’s Baltimore Stallions. The Ravens moved to their own new stadium, now known as M&T Bank Stadium, next to Camden Yards in 1998.

The early years and Ted Marchibroda era (1996–1998)
In the 1996 NFL Draft, the Ravens, with two picks in the first round, drafted offensive tackle Jonathan Ogden at No. 4 overall and linebacker Ray Lewis at No. 26 overall. Both Ogden and Lewis went on to play for the Ravens for their entire professional careers and were both inducted into the Pro Football Hall of Fame.

The 1996 Ravens won their opening game against the Oakland Raiders, but finished the season 4–12 despite receiver Michael Jackson leading the league with 14 touchdown catches. The 1997 Ravens started 3–1. Peter Boulware, a rookie defender from Florida State, recorded 11.5 sacks and was named AFC Defensive Rookie of the Year. The team finished 6–9–1. On October 26, the team made its first trip to Landover, Maryland to play their new regional rivals, the Washington Redskins. The Ravens won the game 20–17. On December 14, 1997, the Ravens played the final professional sporting event at Baltimore’s historic Memorial Stadium, winning 21–19 over the Tennessee Oilers.

1998 marked the opening of a new stadium for the Ravens, currently known as M&T Bank Stadium, but originally named “PSINet Stadium” after the now-defunct internet service provider which purchased the original naming rights. Quarterback Vinny Testaverde left for the New York Jets before the season, and was replaced by former Indianapolis Colt Jim Harbaugh, and later Eric Zeier. Cornerback Rod Woodson joined the team after a successful stint with the Pittsburgh Steelers, and Priest Holmes started getting the first playing time of his career and ran for 1,000 yards. The Ravens finished 1998 with a 6–10 record. On November 29, the Ravens welcomed the Colts back to Baltimore for the first time in 15 years. Amidst a shower of negative cheers towards the Colts, the Ravens won 38–31.

Brian Billick era (1999–2007)

Three consecutive losing seasons under Marchibroda led to a change in the head coach. Brian Billick took over as head coach in 1999. Billick had been offensive coordinator for the record-setting Minnesota Vikings the season before. Quarterback Tony Banks came to Baltimore from the St. Louis Rams and had the best season of his career with 17 touchdown passes and an 81.2 pass rating. He was joined by receiver Qadry Ismail, who posted a 1,000-yard season. The Ravens initially struggled with a record of 4–7 but managed to finish with an 8–8 record.

Due to continual financial hardships for the organization, the NFL took an unusual move and directed Modell to initiate the sale of his franchise. On March 27, 2000, NFL owners approved the sale of 49% of the Ravens to Steve Bisciotti. In the deal, Bisciotti had an option to purchase the remaining 51% for $325 million in 2004 from Art Modell. On April 9, 2004, the NFL approved Steve Bisciotti's purchase of the majority stake in the club.

2000: Super Bowl XXXV champions

Banks shared playing time in the 2000 regular season with Trent Dilfer. Both players put up decent numbers (and a 1,364-yard rushing season by rookie Jamal Lewis helped too) but the defense became the team's hallmark and bailed a struggling offense out in many instances through the season. Ray Lewis was named Defensive Player of the Year. Two of his defensive teammates, Sam Adams and Rod Woodson, made the Pro Bowl. Baltimore's season started strong with a 5–1 record. But the team struggled through mid-season, at one point going five games without scoring an offensive touchdown. The team regrouped and won each of their last seven games, finishing 12–4 and making the playoffs for the first time.

During the 2000 season, the Ravens' dominating defense broke two notable NFL records. They held opposing teams to 165 total points, surpassing the 1985 Chicago Bears mark of 198 points for a 16-game season as well as surpassing the 1986 Chicago Bears mark of 187 points for a 16-game season, which at that time was the current NFL record these things along with outstanding play by the defense places the 2000 Ravens in the discussion as one of the greatest NFL defenses of all time along with the 1985 Chicago Bears, 2002 Tampa Bay Buccaneers, and the 2015 Denver Broncos defenses.

Since the divisional rival Tennessee Titans had a record of 13–3, the Ravens had to play in the wild card round. They dominated the Denver Broncos 21–3 in their first game. In the divisional playoff, they went on the road to Tennessee. With the score tied 10–10 in the fourth quarter, an Al Del Greco field goal attempt was blocked and returned for a touchdown by Anthony Mitchell, and a Ray Lewis interception return for a score put the game squarely in Baltimore's favor. The 24–10 win put the Ravens in the AFC Championship against the Oakland Raiders. The game was rarely in doubt. Shannon Sharpe's 96-yard touchdown catch early in the second quarter followed by an injury to Raiders quarterback Rich Gannon were crucial as the Ravens won easily, 16–3.

Baltimore then went to Tampa for Super Bowl XXXV against the New York Giants. The Ravens’ defense carried them to a win. They recorded four sacks and forced five turnovers, one of which was a Kerry Collins interception returned for a touchdown by Duane Starks. The Giants' only score was a Ron Dixon kickoff return for a touchdown; however, the Ravens immediately countered with a touchdown return on the ensuing kickoff by Jermaine Lewis. The Ravens became champions with a 34–7 win.

2001–2007
In 2001, the Ravens attempted to defend their title with Elvis Grbac as their new starting quarterback, but a season-ending injury to Jamal Lewis on the first day of training camp and poor offensive performances stymied the team. After a 3–3 start, the Ravens defeated the Minnesota Vikings in the final week to clinch a wild card berth at 10–6. In the first round the Ravens showed flashes of their previous year with a 20–3 win over the Miami Dolphins, in which the team forced three turnovers and out-gained the Dolphins 347 yards to 151. In the divisional playoff the Ravens played the Pittsburgh Steelers. Three interceptions by Grbac ended the Ravens' season, as they lost 27–10.

Baltimore ran into salary cap problems entering the 2002 season and was forced to part with a number of impact players. In the NFL Draft, the team selected Ed Reed with the 24th overall pick. Reed would go on to become one of the best safeties in NFL history, making nine Pro Bowls until leaving the Ravens for the Houston Texans in 2013. Despite low expectations, the Ravens stayed somewhat competitive in 2002 until a losing streak in December eliminated any chances of a postseason berth and a 7–9 finish.

In 2003, the Ravens drafted their new quarterback, Kyle Boller, but he was injured midway through the season and was replaced by Anthony Wright. Jamal Lewis ran for 2,066 yards (including a then-NFL record 295 yards in one game against the Cleveland Browns on September 14). With a 10–6 record, Baltimore won their first AFC North division title. Their first playoff game, at home against the Tennessee Titans, went back and forth, with the Ravens being held to only 54 yards total rushing. The Titans won 20–17 on a late field goal, and Baltimore's season ended early.

Ray Lewis was also named Defensive Player of the year for the second time in his career.

In April 2003, Art Modell sold 49% of the team to Steve Bisciotti, a local businessman who had made his fortune in the temporary staffing field. After the season, Art Modell sold his remaining 51% ownership to Bisciotti, ending over 40 years of tenure as an NFL franchise owner.

The Ravens did not make the playoffs in 2004 and finished the season with a record of 9–7 with Boller spending the season at QB. They did get good play from veteran corner Deion Sanders and third-year safety Ed Reed, who won the NFL Defensive Player of the Year award. They were also the only team to defeat the 15–1 Pittsburgh Steelers in the regular season.
The next off-season, the Ravens looked to augment their receiving corps (which was second-worst in the NFL in 2004) by signing Derrick Mason from the Titans and drafting Oklahoma wide receiver Mark Clayton in the first round of the 2005 NFL Draft. However, the Ravens ended their season 6–10.

The 2006 Baltimore Ravens season began with the team trying to improve on their 6–10 record of 2005. The Ravens, for the first time in franchise history, started 4–0, under the leadership of former Titans quarterback Steve McNair.

In 2006, The Ravens lost two straight games mid-season on offensive troubles, prompting coach Billick to drop their offensive coordinator Jim Fassel in their week seven bye. After the bye, and with Billick calling the offense, Baltimore would record a five-game win streak before losing to the Cincinnati Bengals in week 13. Still ranked second overall to first-place San Diego Chargers, the Ravens continued on. They defeated the Kansas City Chiefs, and held the defending Super Bowl champion Pittsburgh Steelers to only one touchdown at Heinz Field, allowing the Ravens to clinch the AFC North.

The Ravens ended the regular season with a franchise-best 13–3 record. Baltimore had secured the AFC North title, the No. 2 AFC playoff seed, and clinched a 1st-round bye by season's end. The Ravens were slated to face the Indianapolis Colts in the second round of the playoffs, in the first meeting of the two teams in the playoffs. Many Baltimore and Indianapolis fans saw this historic meeting as a sort of "Judgment Day" with the new team of Baltimore facing the old team of Baltimore (the former Baltimore Colts having left Baltimore under questionable circumstances in 1984). Both Indianapolis and Baltimore were held to scoring only field goals as the two defenses slugged it out all over M&T Bank Stadium. McNair threw two costly interceptions, including one at the 1-yard line. The eventual Super Bowl champion Colts won 15–6, ending Baltimore's season.

The Ravens hoped to improve upon their 13–3 record but injuries and poor play plagued the team. The Ravens finished the 2007 season in the AFC North cellar with a disappointing 5–11 record. A humiliating 22–16 overtime loss to the previously winless Miami Dolphins on December 16 ultimately led to Billick's dismissal after the end of the regular season. He was replaced by John Harbaugh, the special teams coach of the Philadelphia Eagles and the older brother of former Ravens quarterback Jim Harbaugh (1998).

John Harbaugh/Joe Flacco era (2008–2018)

2008: Arrival of Harbaugh and Flacco

With rookies at head coach (John Harbaugh) and quarterback (Joe Flacco), the Ravens entered the 2008 campaign with much uncertainty. Baltimore smartly recovered in 2008, winning eleven games and achieving a wild card spot in the postseason. On the strength of four interceptions, one resulting in an Ed Reed touchdown, the Ravens began its postseason run by winning a rematch over Miami 27–9 at Dolphin Stadium on January 4, 2009, in a wild-card game. Six days later, they advanced to the AFC Championship Game by avenging a Week 5 loss to the Titans 13–10 at LP Field on a Matt Stover field goal with 53 seconds left in regulation time. The Ravens fell one victory short of Super Bowl XLIII by losing to the Steelers 23–14 at Heinz Field on January 18, 2009.

2009–2011

In 2009, the Ravens won their first three matches, then lost the next three, including a close match in Minnesota. The rest of the season was an uneven string of wins and losses, which included a home victory over Pittsburgh in overtime followed by a Monday Night loss in Green Bay. That game was notable for the number of penalties committed, costing a total of 310 yards, and almost tying with the record set by Tampa Bay and Seattle in 1976. Afterwards, the Ravens easily crushed the Lions and Bears, giving up less than ten points in both games. The next match was against the Steelers, where Baltimore lost a close one before beating the Raiders to end the season. With a record of 9–7, the team finished second in the division and gained another wild card. Moving into the playoffs, they overwhelmed the Patriots; nevertheless they did not reach the AFC Championship because they were routed 20–3 by the Colts in the Divisional Round a week later.

Baltimore managed to beat the Jets 10–9 on the 2010 opener, but then lost a poorly played game against Cincinnati the following week. The Ravens rebounded against the other two division teams, beating Cleveland 24–17 in Week 3 and then . The Ravens scored a fine win (31–17) at home against Denver in Week 5. The Ravens finished the season 12–4, second in the division due to a tiebreaker with Pittsburgh, and earning a wild card spot. Baltimore headed to Kansas City and defeated the Chiefs 30–7, but once again were knocked from the playoffs by Pittsburgh in a hard-fought game.

The Ravens hosted their arch-enemy in Week 1 of the 2011 season. On a hot, humid day in M&T Bank Stadium, crowd noise and multiple Steelers mistakes allowed Baltimore to crush them with three touchdowns 35–7. The frustrated Pittsburgh players also committed several costly penalties. Thus, the Ravens had gained their first-ever victory over the Steelers with Ben Roethlisberger playing and avenged themselves of repeated regular and postseason losses in the series.

But in Week 2, the Ravens collapsed in Tennessee and lost 26–13. They rebounded by routing the Rams in Week 3 and then overpowering the Jets 34–17 in Week 4.
Week 5, the Ravens had a bye week, following a game against the Texans. But in Week 7, Baltimore had a stunning MNF upset loss in Jacksonville as they were held to one touchdown in a 12–7 loss. Their final scoring drive failed as Joe Flacco threw an interception in the closing seconds of the game.

After beating the Cincinnati Bengals in Week 17 of the regular season, the Ravens advanced to the playoffs as the Number 2 seed in the AFC with a record of 12–4. They gained the distinction of AFC North Champions over Pittsburgh (12-4) due to a tie-breaker.

Ravens' Lee Evans was stripped of a 14-yard touchdown pass by the Patriots Sterling Moore with 22 seconds left and Ravens kicker Billy Cundiff pushed a 32-yard field goal attempt wide left on fourth down as the Patriots held on to beat the Ravens 23-20 during the AFC championship game and advance to Super Bowl XLVI.

2012: Ray Lewis' final season and second Super Bowl victory

The Ravens' attempt to convert Joe Flacco into a pocket passer remained a work in progress as the 2012 season began. Terrell Suggs suffered a tendon injury during an off-season basketball game and was unable to play for at least several weeks. In the opener on September 10, Baltimore routed Cincinnati 44–13. After this easy win, the team headed to Philadelphia, but lost 24–23.

Returning home for a primetime rematch of the AFC Championship, another bizarre game ensued. New England picked apart the Baltimore defense (which was considerably weakened without Terrell Suggs and some other players lost over the off-season) for the first half. Trouble began early in the game when a streaker ran out onto the field and had to be tackled by security, and accelerated when, at 2:18 in the 4th quarter, the referees made a holding call on RG Marshal Yanda. Enraged fans repeatedly chanted an obscenity at this penalty. The Ravens finally drove downfield and on the last play of the game, Justin Tucker kicked a 27-yard field goal to win the game 31–30, capping off a second intense and controversially officiated game in a row for the Ravens.

The Ravens would win the AFC North with a 10–6 record, but finished 4th in the AFC playoff seeding, and thus had to play a wild-card game. After defeating the Indianapolis Colts 24–9 at home (the final home game of Ray Lewis), the Ravens traveled to Denver to play against the top-seeded Broncos. In a very back-and-forth contest, the Ravens pulled out a 38-35 victory in two overtimes. They then won their 2nd AFC championship by coming back from a 13-7 halftime deficit to defeat the Patriots once again, 28–13.

The Ravens played the Super Bowl XLVII against the San Francisco 49ers. Baltimore built a 28–6 lead early in the third quarter before a partial power outage in the Superdome suspended play for 34 minutes (earning the game the added nickname of the Blackout Bowl). After play resumed, San Francisco scored 17 unanswered third-quarter points to cut the Ravens' lead, 28–23, and continued to chip away in the fourth quarter. With the Ravens leading late in the game, 34–29, the 49ers advanced to the Baltimore 7-yard line just before the two-minute warning but turned the ball over on downs. The Ravens then took an intentional safety in the waning moments of the game to preserve the victory. Baltimore quarterback Joe Flacco, who completed 22 of 33 passes for 287 yards and three touchdowns, was named Super Bowl MVP.

2013–2018
Coming off as the defending Super Bowl champions, this was the first year in franchise history for the team without Ray Lewis. The Ravens started out 3–2, and started the 2-0 Houston Texans 14-loss streak by shutting them 30–9 in Week 3. However, the Ravens lost their next 3 games, losing to the Green Bay Packers and Pittsburgh Steelers in last-minute field goals and were shut out in an attempt to tie the game against the Cleveland Browns 24–18.

After winning and losing their next game, the Ravens came out 4–6, but managed winning their next four games in dominating the Jets 19–3, a Steelers win 22-20 during Thanksgiving, a booming ending in Baltimore against the Vikings 29–26, and an 18–16 win at Detroit, including Justin Tucker's 61-yard game-winning field goal. The Ravens were 8–6, with the 6th seed, but after losing their next two games, and the San Diego Chargers winning their next two to clinch the 6th seed, the Ravens finished 8-8 and missed the playoffs for the first time since 2007.

On January 27, 2014, the Ravens hired former Houston Texans head coach Gary Kubiak to be their new offensive coordinator after Jim Caldwell accepted the new available head coaching job with the Detroit Lions. On February 15, 2014, star running back Ray Rice and his fiancée Janay Palmer were arrested and charged with assault after a physical altercation at Revel Casino in Atlantic City, New Jersey. Celebrity news website TMZ posted a video of Rice dragging Palmer's body out of an elevator after apparently knocking her out. For the incident, Rice was initially suspended for the first two games of the 2014 NFL season on July 25, 2014, which led to widespread criticism of the NFL.

In Week 1, on September 7, the Baltimore Ravens lost to the Cincinnati Bengals, 23–16. The next day, on September 8, 2014, TMZ released additional footage from an elevator camera showing Rice punching Palmer. The Baltimore Ravens terminated Rice's contract as a result, and was later indefinitely suspended by the NFL, although a judge later vacated this indefinite suspension. In Week 12, the Ravens traveled down for an interconference battle with the New Orleans Saints, which the Ravens won. In Week 16, the Ravens traveled to Houston to take on the Texans. In one of Flacco's worst performances, the offense sputtered against the Houston defense and Flacco threw three interceptions, falling to the Texans 25–13. With their playoff chances and season hanging in the balance, the Ravens took on the Browns in Week 17 at home. After three quarters had gone by and down 10–3, Joe Flacco led the Ravens on a comeback scoring 17 unanswered points, winning 20–10. With the win, and the Kansas City Chiefs defeating the San Diego Chargers, the Ravens clinched their sixth playoff berth in seven seasons.

In the wild card round, the Ravens won 30–17 against their divisional rivals, the Pittsburgh Steelers, at Heinz Field. In the next game in the Divisional round, the Ravens faced the New England Patriots. Despite a strong offensive effort and having a 14-point lead twice in the game, the Ravens were defeated by the Patriots 35–31, ending their season.

The 2015 season marked 20 seasons of the franchise's existence competing in the NFL, which the franchise recognized with a special badge being worn on their uniforms during the 2015 NFL season. The Ravens lost key players such as Joe Flacco, Justin Forsett, Terrell Suggs, Steve Smith Sr., and Eugene Monroe to season-ending injuries. Injuries and their inability to win close games early in the season led to the first losing season in the Harbaugh-Flacco era. The 2016 Ravens finished 8–8, but failed to qualify the playoffs for the second straight year. They were eliminated from playoff contention after their Week 16 loss to their division rivals, the Steelers. This was the first time the Ravens missed the playoffs in consecutive seasons since 2004–2005, as well as the first in the Harbaugh/Flacco era.

During the 2017 season, the Ravens improved upon their 8–8 record from 2016 by one win, finishing the season 9-7 and missing the playoffs for the third year in a row. This marked the first time the Ravens failed to make the playoffs in three straight seasons since the team's first three years of existence (1996-1998). The Ravens suffered a loss at home to the Cincinnati Bengals in the final game of the season that prevented them from earning a playoff berth.

Lamar Jackson era (2018–present)

The Ravens drafted QB Lamar Jackson with the 32nd pick in the 2018 draft. After the team started the season with a 4–5 record, Jackson took over as the starting QB in Week 11 when Joe Flacco was sidelined with a hip injury. The team won six of its next seven games, finishing the 2018 season with a 10–6 record and winning the AFC North, giving them their first playoff appearance since 2014 and their first division title since 2012. The Ravens lost to the Los Angeles Chargers in the Wild Card round with Jackson at quarterback, making him the youngest QB in NFL history to start a playoff game. At the conclusion of the season, Ozzie Newsome stepped down as the team's general manager. He was replaced by longtime assistant Eric DeCosta.

On March 13, 2019, the Ravens traded Joe Flacco to the Denver Broncos in exchange for a fourth-round pick in the 2019 NFL Draft. That season, Lamar Jackson led the Ravens to a franchise-best 14–2 record, including a 12-game winning streak to finish the regular season. On December 22, they clinched home-field advantage for the first time in franchise history following a win over the Cleveland Browns. On December 8, Jackson became only the second player in NFL history to rush for over 1,000 yards from the quarterback position. Four days later, Jackson broke Michael Vick's single-season quarterback rushing record of 1,037 yards. Thirteen Ravens were selected to the 2019 Pro Bowl, matching the all-time NFL record.
The Ravens finished the 2019 regular season with 3,296 rushing yards, the most rushing yards by any team in NFL history during a season and they became the first team in NFL history to average at least 200 passing yards and 200 rushing yards per game in the same season.

Despite earning the number-one seed in the playoffs, the Ravens were eliminated by the sixth-seeded Tennessee Titans in the Divisional Round of the playoffs, 28–12. Lamar Jackson was unanimously voted AP NFL MVP, becoming only the second player in NFL history to do so, after Tom Brady in 2010.

In 2020, the Ravens went 6–5 in their first 11 games, but rebounded and finished the season 11–5, taking second place in the AFC North and earning a Wild Card playoff berth with the fifth seed. They also led the NFL in rushing yards for the second year in a row during the regular season, with 3,071 yards. In the Wild Card round, they defeated the fourth-seeded Tennessee Titans in Nashville, 20–13. In the Divisional Round, they fell to the second-seeded Buffalo Bills, 17–3.

In 2021, the Ravens claimed the record of consecutive preseason wins with 20, overtaking Vince Lombardi’s Green Bay Packers record. In Week 3 of the 2021 season against the Detroit Lions, Justin Tucker put his name in the NFL record books by kicking the longest field goal in the history of the National Football League, 66 yards, which also was the field goal that won the game and 5 yards longer than his previous career long of 61 yards that was also kicked in Detroit. The following week, the Ravens tied the NFL record of consecutive 100 yard rushing games by a team with 43 in a win over the Denver Broncos, equaling the 1974 to ‘77 Pittsburgh Steelers record. The team reached an 8–3 record by Week 12, but ended the season on a six-game losing streak to finish 8–9, missing the playoffs and coming in last in the AFC North. Jackson sustained an ankle injury during the Week 14 loss to the Browns and did not appear in any subsequent games.

Rivalries

Pittsburgh Steelers
By far the team's biggest rival is the Pittsburgh Steelers. Pittsburgh and Baltimore are separated by a less-than-5-hour drive along Interstate 70. Both teams are known for their hard-hitting physical style of play. They play twice a year in the AFC North, and have met four times in the playoffs. Pittsburgh leads the all-time series, 30–24, and holds a 3–1 advantage in the four matchups in the postseason. Games between these two teams usually come down to the wire as most within the last 5 years have come down to under 4 points.
The rivalry is considered one of the most significant and intense in the NFL today.

Other AFC North rivals

The Ravens also have divisional rivalries with the Cleveland Browns and Cincinnati Bengals. The rivalry with the Browns has been very one-sided; Baltimore holds an advantage of 33–11 against Cleveland. The rivalry with Cincinnati has been closer, with the Ravens slightly holding the edge in the all-time series 27–25.

New England Patriots
The Ravens first met the New England Patriots in 1996, but the rivalry truly started in 2007 when the Ravens suffered a bitter 27–24 loss in the Patriots' quest for perfection. The rivalry began to escalate in 2009 when the Patriots beat the Ravens 27–21 in a game that involved a confrontation between Patriots quarterback Tom Brady and Ravens linebacker Terrell Suggs. Both players would go on to take verbal shots at each other through the media after the game.

While the Patriots lead the overall series, 11–4, the teams have split four postseason meetings, 2–2. The Ravens won the 2009 Wild Card Round, 33–14, and the 2012 AFC Championship game, 28–13. The Patriots won the 2011 AFC Championship Game 23–20 and the 2014 Divisional Round, 35–31.

Tennessee Titans
Reemerging in the late 2010s, the rivalry actually started in the early 2000s when both teams were in the AFC Central, with both teams having tough and bitter games, Ravens gave the Titans their first ever loss at the new Adelphia Coliseum in the 2000 season and the Ravens eliminated Tennessee during the playoffs later on. Fans and analysts have noted an emerging rivalry between the Baltimore Ravens and the Tennessee Titans of the AFC South. While there is no known animosity between the cities of Baltimore and Nashville, games between their respective teams have become heated and included fiery verbal exchanges between coaches and players.

Logo controversy
The team's first helmet logo, used from 1996 through the 1999 Pro Bowl, featured raven wings outspread from a shield displaying a letter B framed by the word Ravens overhead and a cross bottony underneath. The US Fourth Circuit Court of Appeals affirmed a jury verdict that the logo infringed on a copyright retained by Frederick E. Bouchat, an amateur artist and security guard in Maryland, but that he was entitled to only three dollars in damages from the NFL.

Bouchat had submitted his design to the Maryland Stadium Authority by fax after learning that Baltimore was to acquire an NFL team. He was not credited for the design when the logo was announced. Bouchat sued the team, claiming to be the designer of the emblem; representatives of the team asserted that the image had been designed independently. The court ruled in favor of Bouchat, noting that team owner Modell had access to Bouchat's work. Bouchat's fax had gone to John Moag, the Maryland Stadium Authority chairman, whose office was located in the same building as Modell's. Bouchat ultimately was not awarded monetary compensation in the damages phase of the case.

The Baltimore Sun ran a poll showing three designs for new helmet logos. Fans participating in the poll expressed a preference for a raven's head in profile over other designs. Art Modell announced that he would honor this preference but still wanted a letter B to appear somewhere in the design. The new Ravens logo, introduced in 1999, featured a raven's head in profile with the letter B superimposed. The secondary logo is a shield that honors Baltimore's history of heraldry. Alternating Calvert and Crossland emblems (seen also in the flag of Maryland and the flag of Baltimore) are interlocked with stylized letters B and R.

Uniforms
The design of the Ravens uniform has remained essentially unchanged since the team's inaugural season in 1996. Art Modell admitted to ESPN's Roy Firestone that the Ravens' colors, introduced in early 1996, were inspired by the Northwestern Wildcats 1995 dream season. Helmets are black with purple "talon" stripes rising from the facemask to the crown. Players normally wear purple jerseys at home and white jerseys on the road. In 1996 the team wore black pants with a single large white stripe for all games.

In 1997 the Ravens opted for a more classic NFL look with white pants sporting stripes in purple and black, along with the jerseys sporting a different font for the uniform numbers. The white pants were worn with both home and road jerseys. The road uniform (white pants with white jerseys) was worn by the Ravens in Super Bowl XXXV, at the end of the 2000 NFL season. This all-white combination was originally worn with black socks, but starting in 2021, the Ravens began wearing white hosiery with the all-white uniform.

In the 2002 season the Ravens began the practice of wearing white jerseys for the home opener that has a 1:00 kickoff. In recent seasons, the practice has come when the home game is played in week one. Since John Harbaugh became the head coach in 2008, the Ravens have also worn their white jerseys at home for preseason games.

In November 2004 the team introduced an alternate uniform design featuring black jerseys and solid black pants with black socks. The all-black uniform was first worn for a home game against the Cleveland Browns, entitled "Pitch Black" night, that resulted in a Ravens win. The uniform has since been worn for select prime-time national game broadcasts and other games of significance.

The Ravens began wearing black pants again with the white jersey in 2008. On December 7, 2008, during a Sunday Night Football game against the Washington Redskins, the Ravens introduced a new combination of black jersey with white pants. It was believed to be due to the fact that John Harbaugh doesn't like the "blackout" look. However, on December 19, 2010, the Ravens wore their black jerseys and black pants in a 30–24 victory over the New Orleans Saints.

Since 2010, the Ravens have worn their black jerseys at least twice each season. From 2011 to 2013 and again in 2015, they wore the all blacks once and the black on white once. In 2014 and 2016, they wore all black both times they wore alternate uniforms. In 2017, they wore all black twice and black on white once (although the league is supposed to limit teams to wearing alternate jerseys a maximum of two times a season).

On December 5, 2010, the Ravens reverted to the black pants with the purple jerseys versus the Pittsburgh Steelers during NBC's Sunday Night Football telecast. The Ravens lost to the Steelers 13–10. They wore the same look again for their game against the Cleveland Browns on December 24, 2011, and they won, 20–14. They wore this combination a third time against the Houston Texans on January 15, 2012, in the AFC Divisional playoff. They won 20–13. They would again wear this combination on January 6, 2013, during the AFC Wild Card playoff and what turned out to be Ray Lewis' final home game, where they defeated the Indianapolis Colts 24–9.

From their inaugural season until 2006, the Ravens wore white cleats with their uniforms; they switched to black cleats in 2007. From the mid-2010s onward, the NFL relaxed its rules regarding primary cleat colors, and Ravens players began wearing customized cleats in either purple, black, gold or white.

On December 20, 2015, the team unexpectedly debuted gold pants for the first time, wearing them with their regular purple jerseys against the Kansas City Chiefs. Although gold is an official accent color of the Ravens, the pants got an overwhelmingly negative response on social media by both Ravens fans and fans of other NFL teams, with some comparisons being made to the rival Pittsburgh Steelers' pants, and mustard.

During the 2015 season, the NFL announced a jersey promotion called Color Rush in which teams would wear uniforms typically of one color head-to-toe during select prime-time games. The promotion was used three times that season; all the games that featured them were on Thursday Night and had both teams wear them in each. The following season, the league released uniforms for all 32 teams and announced they would be worn during all Thursday Night games that year, as well as on Christmas. The Ravens had one Thursday Night game in 2016; they wore their all-purple Color Rush uniforms and won 28–7 over the division rival Cleveland Browns. They had one other Thursday Night game the following season, in which they again wore the jerseys and won 40–0 over the Miami Dolphins. In their Christmas 2016 game against the Steelers, the Ravens wore their regular all-white uniforms while their rivals wore their Color Rush uniforms.

On September 13, 2018, the Ravens debuted a new combination in a road game against the Cincinnati Bengals, wearing white jerseys with purple pants. The purple pants are similar to the ones used for Color Rush except that it has side stripes of black and white; the Color Rush purple pants have gold and white stripes. Then on October 21 against the New Orleans Saints, the Ravens paired their new purple pants with their regular purple uniforms. Black socks were originally worn with this combination, but on January 2, 2022, the Ravens wore purple socks with the regular all-purple combination against the Los Angeles Rams, essentially replicating their Color Rush uniforms but with minimal gold elements.

For the regular season finale against the Browns on December 30, the Ravens wore their black uniforms with purple pants. The Ravens wore this combination again October 11, 2021, against the Indianapolis Colts on Monday Night Football in a 31–25 overtime win.

Marching band

The team marching band is called Baltimore's Marching Ravens. They began as the Colts' marching band and have operated continuously from September 7, 1947, to the present. They helped campaign for football to return to Baltimore after the Colts moved. Because they stayed in Baltimore after the Colts left, the band is nicknamed "the band that would not die" and were the subject of an episode of ESPN's 30 for 30. The Washington Commanders are the only other NFL team that currently has a marching band.

Players of note

Current roster

Pro Football Hall of Fame

Note: The following lists players who officially played for the Ravens. For other Hall of Famers, players whose numbers were retired, and players who played for the Baltimore Colts, see Indianapolis Colts. Bold number notes player inducted as a member of the Ravens. For Cleveland Browns players, including those in the Hall of Fame and those whose numbers were retired, see Cleveland Browns.

Retired numbers
The Ravens do not have officially retired numbers. However, the number 19 has not been issued out of respect for Baltimore Colts quarterback Johnny Unitas, except for quarterback Scott Mitchell in his lone season in Baltimore in 1999. In addition, numbers 75, 52, and 20, in honor of Jonathan Ogden, Ray Lewis, and Ed Reed respectively, have not been issued since those players' retirements from football.

Ring of Honor

The Ravens have a "Ring of Honor" which is on permanent display encircling the field of M&T Bank Stadium. The ring currently honors 20 members, including eight former members of the Baltimore Colts.

Key/Legend

First-round draft picks

The team's first draft was the 1996 NFL Draft, where they selected UCLA offensive tackle Jonathan Ogden fourth overall and University of Miami linebacker Ray Lewis 24th overall. Both players won a Super Bowl with the team, earned numerous Pro Bowl and All-Pro selections, and are members of the Pro Football Hall of Fame. Along with their pick in the next year's draft, this was the highest first-round draft pick that the Ravens have had. In 1996, 2000, 2018 and 2020, the Ravens had two first-round draft picks (2018 was the only year in the Ravens traded up during the draft). However, in 2004 they had none. Two of their first round picks have made at least ten Pro Bowls.

Team records

Passing

+ = min. 500 attempts, # = min. 100 attempts, ∗ = minimum 15 attempts,

Rushing

∗ = minimum 15 attempts, # = min. 100 attempts, + = min. 500 attempts

Receiving

∗ = minimum 4 receptions, # = min. 20 receptions, + = min. 200 receptions

Other

Returns

Kicking

Defense

Exceptional performances

Other career records
Most Tackles: Ray Lewis, ILB, 1,573 (1996–2012)
Most Forced Fumbles: Terrell Suggs, EDGE, 28 (2003–2018)
Longest Field Goal Made: Justin Tucker, 66 yards (2012–present)
Longest Fumble Recovery: Marlon Humphrey, CB, 70 yards (November 3, 2019)

All records as of December 18, 2019 per Pro-Football Reference.com

Staff

Head coaches

 Ted Marchibroda (1996–1998)
 Brian Billick (1999–2007)
 John Harbaugh (2008–present)

Current staff

Broadcast media

References

Further reading
 (available online)

External links

 
 Baltimore Ravens at the National Football League official website

 
National Football League teams
American football teams in Baltimore
American football teams established in 1996
1996 establishments in Maryland